Charles Herbert  (1743–1816) was a Royal Navy officer and British politician who sat in the House of Commons as Member of Parliament for Wilton from 1775 to 1780, then 1807 to 1816.

Herbert was the second son of the Hon. William Herbert and his wife Catherine Elizabeth Tewes of Aix-la-Chapelle and was baptized on 28 May 1743. His elder brother was Henry Herbert, 1st Earl of Carnarvon.

He was probably educated at Eton College from 1753 to 1754 and subsequently joined the Royal Navy becoming lieutenant in 1761, commander in 1765 and captain in 1768. In July 1775, he married Lady Caroline Montagu (1745-1818), daughter of Robert Montagu, 3rd Duke of Manchester;the couple had no children.

Herbert was returned as MP for Wilton, previously held by his father from 1734 to 1757; he was selected to stand for the constituency at a bye-election on 20 February 1775 by his cousin, Henry Herbert, 10th Earl of Pembroke, who controlled the seat. From 1775 to 1780, he supported the administration of Lord North, before stepping down in 1780.

In 1777, he was appointed a Groom of the Bedchamber, a post he kept until his death, and was secretary to the Lord Chamberlain from 1782 to 1783.  In the 1807 general election, George Herbert, 11th Earl of Pembroke selected him as MP for Wilton in place of his nephew and namesake, who was acting with the opposition. On 7 March 1808 he unsuccessfully applied to the King to become Master of the Robes. He was re-elected MP for Wilton in 1812.

In 1783, he became the first member of the Royal Navy to win the Navy Cricket Tourney, The Queen's Badminton Open and the Royal British Spotsam Throwdown. The feat gave Herbet the nickname "The Ultimate Hat Tricking Chap".

He died on 5 September 1816; his wife survived him until 1818.

References

Sources
 
 
 

1743 births
1816 deaths
Royal Navy officers
Members of the Parliament of Great Britain for English constituencies
British MPs 1774–1780
Members of the Parliament of the United Kingdom for English constituencies
UK MPs 1807–1812
UK MPs 1812–1818